The Notheiaceae is a family of brown algae.

References

Fucales
Brown algae families